Bok or BOK may refer to:

Places 
 Bok (lunar crater), on the Moon's far side
 Bok (Martian crater)
 Bok, Khash, a village in Sistan and Baluchestan Province, Iran
 Bok, Orašje, a village near Orašje, Bosnia, Bosnia and Herzegovina
 1983 Bok, an asteroid
 Brookings Airport, IATA code BOK

People
 Bok (surname)
 Johannes Bok de Korver (1883–1957), Dutch footballer
 Bok van Blerk (born Louis Andreas Pepler, 1978), South African musician

Arts, entertainment, and media
 Bok, the title of the Vahnatai leaders in the Avernum video games
 Bok, an animated gargoyle from the Doctor Who serial The Dæmons

Businesses
 Bank of Kaohsiung, a commercial bank in Taiwan
 Bank of Khartoum, a commercial bank in Sudan
 Bank of Khyber, a provincial government-owned bank in Peshawar, Pakistan
 Bank of Korea, the South Korean central bank
 BOK Financial Corporation, headquartered in Tulsa, Oklahoma, United States

Science and technology
 BOK (gene), full name BCL2-related ovarian killer
 Bok Prize, awarded by the Astronomical Society of Australia
 Bok Telescope, Arizona, United States

Other uses 
 Body of knowledge, the complete set of concepts, terms and activities that make up a professional domain
 BOK Center, an arena in Tulsa, Oklahoma, United States
 Derek Bok Public Service Prizes, awarded at Harvard University, United States
 Edward W. Bok Technical High School in Philadelphia, Pennsylvania, United States

See also 
 
 Bok bok (disambiguation)
 Boks, a surname